Modelia granosa, common name the southern cat's eye, is a medium to large species of sea snail which has a shell with a pearly interior and a calcareous operculum. It is a marine gastropod mollusc in the family Turbinidae, the turban snails.

Description
The size of the shell varies between 25 mm and 80 mm.
The orbiculate, imperforate shell has a depressed-conic shape. It is, pinkish yellow, unicolored, or clouded with purplish or brown. The seven whorls are rounded, the upper two smooth, the others closely minutely granulose in regular spiral series. The body whorl is rounded and descending. The subcircular aperture is white and iridescent within. The white columella is wide, subexcavated in the center. The thin callus is shining and rose-tinted.

The ovate operculum is flat within, with 5-6 whorls and a subcentral nucleus. On its outside it is white, thick, subgibbous, and minutely tuberculate
at its center, subcanaliculate at its periphery.

Distribution
It is only known to occur in New Zealand.

Notes
Additional information regarding this species:
 Authority: Use of name from Martyn (1784) validated by ICZN Opinion 479.

References

 
 Williams S.T., Karube S. & Ozawa T. (2008) Molecular systematics of Vetigastropoda: Trochidae, Turbinidae and Trochoidea redefined. Zoologica Scripta 37: 483–506.
 Alf A. & Kreipl K. (2003). A Conchological Iconography: The Family Turbinidae, Subfamily Turbininae, Genus Turbo. Conchbooks, Hackenheim Germany

External links
 

granosa
Gastropods of New Zealand
Gastropods described in 1784